Miguel Ríos Campaña (born 7 June 1944) is a Spanish singer, composer, actor. He is one of the pioneers of rock and roll in Spain.

Biography
Ríos was born in La Cartuja, a neighborhood of Granada. The youngest of seven children, he went to work in a local bar at the age of fifteen after little formal education. His interest in rock and roll led him to participate in a song contest at Cenicienta 60 radio station, in which he and his friends won a prize for singing the Paul Anka song "You Are My Destiny".

With his mother's permission (his father had died a few months earlier), he moved to Madrid in 1961 at the age of sixteen, where he recorded his first four songs. In popular circles he became known as Mike Ríos, the King of Twist.

As Mike Ríos he obtained some television popularity during the first half of the 1960s. In 1964 he resumed using his real name which cost him the support of his group, Los Relámpagos (the Lightning).  He made his first incursion into cinema with a movie titled Dos chicas locas, locas (Two Crazy Girls).

An introspective search for his true identity resulted in some rocky times. In 1967 he recorded "Vuelvo a Granada", "El río", "Contra el cristal", "El cartel", and "Mira hacia ti". It was in 1970 that he came to be known as a superstar in Spain. His song "Himno de la alegría" (Hymn of Joy) was an extract of the last movement of the ninth symphony of Beethoven and appeared at the height of what was known as symphonic rock.  It was released in both the United States and the United Kingdom as "A Song of Joy" in May 1970 on the A&M Records label, where combined sales in the U.S. and Canada reached the one million mark in July.  It reached No. 16 in the UK singles charts in August 1970. It was awarded a gold record by the Recording Industry Association of America. The song peaked at number 1 in Australia and Canada.

Ríos sold three million copies worldwide and was number one on some foreign music charts. It reached Number 14 on the Billboard Hot 100 chart in 1970.

The artistic career of Rios came to a sudden stop when, in 1972, he was arrested and jailed for smoking of marijuana shortly after his Rock y Amor (Rock and Love) concert. In the mid seventies he recorded three progressive rock albums, but they were not commercially successful.

In 1980, one of his most successful songs, "Santa Lucía", a ballad by Argentinian Roque Narvaja, appeared in his Rocanrol bumerang album.

In 1982, Rios released Rock and Rios a live double album recorded during the 5 and 6 March in Madrid at the Pabellón del Real Madrid and published in June of the same year. This album is considered by many music critics and fans as one of the most important works of modern Spanish (Iberian) rock and a turning point for the music industry in Spain. Rios sold over 450,000 copies in less than one year, a feat he never again came close to surpassing. Ironically this concert was a celebration of his 20 years in the music business,  yet most of the audience members had not even been born when he began his career. One of the unique aspects of this album was its release.   While most live albums at the time were released after a tour was over, Rios released his at the same time as he started his tour. The success of both made him one of the wealthiest entertainers of the era. Rock and Rios is also considered a cultural marker for the transformation of Spanish society, as it slowly begun to enjoy the freedoms of a democracy born only six years earlier. It is also thought of as the precursor to Spain's "La Gran Movida" (literal translation: The Great Movement or The Great Flow - conceptual translation: The Great Vibe), which is a term that loosely defines the street youth culture of the 1980s in Spain.

Discography/certifications
Mira hacia ti 1969
Despierta 1970
Unidos 1971
Miguel Ríos en directo: Conciertos de Rock y amor.1972
Miguel Ríos: Éxitos 1973
Memorias de un ser humano 1974
La huerta atómica 1976
Al-Andalus 1977
Los viejos rokeros nunca mueren 1979
Rocanrol bumerang 1980 - Spain: Gold (1980, page 913)
Extraños en el escaparate 1981 - Spain: Gold (1981 page 914)
Rock and Rios 1982 - Spain 3× Platinum (1982, page 916)
El Rock de una noche de verano 1983
La encrucijada 1984 - Spain: Gold (1984, page 918)
Lo más de rock en el ruedo 1985
El año del cometa 1986
Que noche la de aquel año 1987
Miguel Ríos 1989
Directo al corazón 1991
Así que pasen treinta años 1992
Por siempre 1995
Canciones de amor para tiempos difíciles 1995
Como si fuera la primera vez 1996
Miguel Ríos en concierto: Big Band Ríos 1998
Ana Belén, Miguel Ríos cantan a Kurt Weill 1999
Miguel Ríos y las estrellas del rock latino 2001
60mp3 2004
Solo o en compañía de otros 2008
Bye Bye Ríos 2010
Symphonic Ríos (1CD + DVD) 2018

References and notes

Much of the content of this article comes from the equivalent Spanish-language Wikipedia article, accessed September 5, 2006.

1944 births
Living people
People from Granada
Singers from Andalusia
Spanish male singers
Rock en Español musicians
Latin Grammy Lifetime Achievement Award winners
Latin music composers
Latin music record producers
Spanish composers
Spanish male composers
Spanish record producers